Murder in Coweta County is a 1983 American made-for-television drama film starring Johnny Cash and Andy Griffith. It originally aired on February 15, 1983 on CBS. It is based on actual events of a murder in Coweta County in April 1948 committed in Coweta County in the U.S. state of Georgia.

Plot
The film centres around two main characters, Sheriff Lamar Potts of Coweta County, Georgia, and John Wallace of Meriwether County, Georgia, who rules a vast estate known as "The Kingdom". 

Wilson Turner, a poor white tenant sharecropper, was dismissed by Wallace, even though he was given permission to do the liquor run. He was forced to leave his home, with his wife and child, and was unable to harvest his crops on his farm. In revenge, Turner decided to steal one of Wallace's prized Guernsey cows. He was captured in a neighboring county and brought back to Meriwether County to face Wallace. 

Turner was inexplicably released from jail due to a 'lack of evidence' by Sheriff Hardy Collier. Wallace and three of his men were waiting for him outside the jail, and at that stage Turner knew that it was a stitch up. He got into his truck and tried to escape, Wallace and his gang chased him on the pretext that Turner was an escaped prisoner. In the pursuit they had crossed the county line into Coweta County. Turner is forced to stop because he ran out of gasoline. Wallace then kills Turner by pistol-whipping him with his gun. Sheriff Potts then pursues Wallace and his gang to obtain justice for Turner, but needs to gather enough evidence to prove his case.

Cast

References 

1983 television films
American drama television films
American crime drama films
1980s English-language films